Homalictus paradnanus, also known as Lasioglossum (Homalictus) paradnanus, is a species of bee in the genus Homalictus, of the family Halictidae. Sometimes, genus Homalictus is placed as a subgenus within the genus Lasioglossum.

References
 https://www.scribd.com/doc/117262646/2/The-Taxonomy-and-Conservation-Status-of-the-Bees
 https://www.academia.edu/7390502/AN_UPDATED_CHECKLIST_OF_BEES_OF_SRI_LANKA_WITH_NEW_RECORDS
 http://www.cea.lk/web/images/pdf/redlist2012.pdf

Halictidae
Insects described in 1914